Forell is a surname. Notable people with the surname include:

Birger Forell (1893–1958), Swedish priest
Caroline Forell, American legal scholar and professor emerita at the University of Oregon School of Law
George Forell (1919–2011), Germany scholar, author, lecturer and guest professor in the field of Christian ethics
Nicholas Forell (1923–1998), German  structural engineer and founder and former president of the San Francisco firm Forell/Elsesser Engineers
Paul Forell (1892–1959), German international footballer